Lithuania Business University of Applied Sciences (Lithuanian: Lietuvos verslo kolegija, LTVK) is a private university located in Klaipėda and Vilnius, Lithuania. The university was established in 1994. The university offers both undergraduate and post-graduate courses.

References

External links 
 

Business schools in Lithuania
Colleges in Lithuania
Education in Klaipėda
Education in Vilnius
1994 establishments in Lithuania